The Northern Riders' Championship was an individual speedway competition inaugurated in 1938 and revived in 1960 for top riders of teams from the North of Great Britain.

Winners

References

Speedway competitions in the United Kingdom